So You Think You Can Dance is a United States television reality program and dance competition airing on the Fox Broadcasting Company network. Season five premiered on May 21, 2009, with Nigel Lythgoe and Mary Murphy returning as permanent judges and Cat Deeley returning to host. Jeanine Mason was crowned America's Favorite Dancer on August 6, 2009, making her the second female to win the show. For the first time, the show moved to a new stage, but it turned out to be the last season at CBS Studios.

Auditions 

Open auditions for this season were held in the following locations:

Las Vegas week 
Judges: Nigel Lythgoe, Mary Murphy, Mia Michaels, Lil' C, Adam Shankman, Debbie Allen.

The Las Vegas callbacks were held at Planet Hollywood Resort and Casino in Las Vegas, Nevada. 172 dancers were invited to participate in the callback auditions. This number was cut to 32 dancers, 16 male and 16 female, before the announcement of the season's top 20 contestants. Las Vegas week included the following rounds, with cuts made after each:

Top 20 Contestants

Female Contestants

Male Contestants

Elimination chart 

Contestants are listed in reverse chronological order of elimination.
The song for the eliminated female contestants was "Already Gone" by Kelly Clarkson. The song for the eliminated male contestants was "On Your Own" by Green River Ordinance.

Performances

Week 1 (June 10, 2009) 

Judges: Nigel Lythgoe, Mary Murphy, Adam Shankman
Couple dances:

Week 2 (June 17, 2009) 

Judges: Nigel Lythgoe, Mary Murphy, Lil' C
Couple dances:

Week 3 (June 24, 2009) 

Judges: Nigel Lythgoe, Mary Murphy, Toni Basil
Couple dances:

Week 4 (July 1, 2009) 

Judges: Nigel Lythgoe, Mary Murphy, Mia Michaels
Couple dances:

Week 5 (July 8, 2009) 

Judges: Nigel Lythgoe, Mary Murphy, Tyce Diorio
Couple dances:

Week 6 (July 15, 2009) 

Judges: Nigel Lythgoe, Mary Murphy, Debbie Allen

 Group dances:

Couple dances:

 Solos:

Week 7 (July 22, 2009) 

Judges: Nigel Lythgoe, Ellen DeGeneres, Mary Murphy, Mia Michaels
 Group dance: Top 8: "Let It Rock"—Kevin Rudolf featuring Lil Wayne (Choreographer: Travis Wall)
Couple dances:

 Solos:

Week 8 (July 29, 2009) 

Judges: Nigel Lythgoe, Mary Murphy, Lil' C

 Group dances:

Couple dances:

Solos:

Week 9 (August 5, 2009) 

Judges: Nigel Lythgoe, Mary Murphy, Adam Shankman

 Group dance: Top 4: "Boys Boys Boys"—Lady Gaga (Pop-Jazz; Choreographer: Wade Robson)
Duo dances:

Solos:

Results shows

Week 1 (June 11, 2009) 

 Group dance: Top 20: "Boom Boom Pow"—The Black Eyed Peas (Hip-hop; Choreographer: Shane Sparks)
 Musical guest: "Fire Burning"—Sean Kingston
 Guest dancers: Miriam Larici and Leonardo Barrionuevo: "Tangueira" from Forever Tango (Argentine Tango)
 Solos:

 Eliminated:
 Paris Torres
 Tony Bellissimo
 New partners:
 None

Week 2 (June 18, 2009) 
 Group dance: Top 18: "Higher Ground"—Stevie Wonder (Contemporary; Choreographer: Mia Michaels)
 Musical guest: "Goodbye"—Kristinia DeBarge
 Guest dancer: Amrapali Ambegaokar: "Ganesh Toda Tankar"—Guru Sundarlal Gangani & Smt. Anjani Ambegoakar (Kathak)
 Solos:

 Eliminated:
 Ashley Valerio
 Maksim "Max" Kapitannikov
 New partners:
 Kayla Radomski and Kūpono Aweau

Week 3 (June 25, 2009) 
 Group dance: Top 16: "I Know You Want Me (Calle Ocho)"—Pitbull (Hip-hop/Samba; Choreographers: Dmitry Chaplin, Napoleon and Tabitha D'umo)
 Musical guest: "Take Me on the Floor"—The Veronicas
 Guest dancers: The Rage Boyz Crew: "Feel It"—Colby O'Donis & Mauli-b (Hip-Hop; Choreographer: Tiffany Burton)
 Solos:

 Eliminated:
 Asuka Kondoh
 Jonathan Platero
 New partners:
 Karla Garcia and Vitolio Jeune

Week 4 (July 2, 2009) 

 Group dance: Top 14: "A Brand New Day" from The Wiz (Broadway; Choreographer: Tyce Diorio)
 Musical guest: "I Do Not Hook Up"—Kelly Clarkson
 Guest dancers: Desmond Richardson and Patricia Hachey: "Caprice in E Minor, Op. 1 No 3"—Midori (Contemporary Ballet; Choreographers: Dwight Rhoden and Desmond Richardson)
 Solos:

 Eliminated:
 Karla Garcia
 Vitolio Jeune
 New partners:
 None

Week 5 (July 9, 2009) 

 Group dance: Top 12: "Seven Nation Army"—The White Stripes (Hip-hop; Choreographers: Napoleon and Tabitha D'umo)
 Musical guests: "When Love Takes Over"—David Guetta and Kelly Rowland
 Solos:

 Eliminated:
 Caitlin Kinney
 Phillip Chbeeb
 New partners:
 None. Now that only ten dancers remaining, new partners are randomly assigned each week. They'll also be voted individually.

Week 6 (July 16, 2009) 
Judges: only Debbie Allen and Mary Murphy
Note: This season dancers are performing the same solos at the results shows as in the performance show
 Group dance: Top 10: "So Much Betta"—Janet Jackson (Jazz; Choreographers: Wade and Amanda Robson)
 Musical guest: "I Gotta Feeling"—The Black Eyed Peas
 Bottom 4:
Kūpono Aweau
Randi Evans
Ade Obayomi
Melissa Sandvig
 Eliminated:
 Randi Evans
 Kūpono Aweau

Week 7 (July 23, 2009) 
Judges: Nigel Lythgoe, Mary Murphy, Mia Michaels
Note: This was the 100th episode of SYTYCD
 Group dance: Top 8: "One" from A Chorus Line (Contemporary; Choreographer: Mia Michaels)
 Musical guest: "Get Happy"—Katie Holmes
The performance was not performed on stage but pre-taped for promoting Dizzy Feet Foundation.
 Guest dancers:
 The three winners of the Primetime Emmy Award for Outstanding Choreography were reenacted by their respective original dancers:

 Bottom 4:
Brandon Bryant
Jason Glover
Janette Manrara
Kayla Radomski
 Eliminated:
 Janette Manrara
 Jason Glover

 Ryan Rankine and Natalie Fotopoulos were absent, however, the dancers were joined by their choreographers, Wade Robson.

Week 8 (July 30, 2009) 

 Group dance: Top 6: "Send in the Clowns"—Judy Collins (Broadway; Choreographer: Tyce Diorio)
 Musical guest: "So Fine"—Sean Paul
 Guest dancers:
 JabbaWockeeZ: "Freak-A-Zoid"—Midnight Star (Hip-Hop)
 The four nominees for the 2009 Primetime Emmy Award for Outstanding Choreography were reenacted by their respective original dancers:

 Dancers that performed a solo again:
Evan Kasprzak
Ade Obayomi
Kayla Radomski
Melissa Sandvig
 Eliminated:
 Melissa Sandvig
 Ade Obayomi

Week 9 (Finale) (August 6, 2009) 
Judges: Nigel Lythgoe, Mary Murphy, Adam Shankman, Debbie Allen, Tyce Diorio, Lil' C, Mia Michaels

 Group dances:

 Guest dancers:

 The routine was originally performed by the top 14 finalists.
 The routine was originally performed by the top 16 finalists.
 Talia Fowler is the winner of So You Think You Can Dance Australias second season, and this performance comprised a portion of his prize package.

 Judges' picks 

 4th Place Kayla Radomski
 3rd Place Evan Kasprzak
 Runner-Up: Brandon Bryant
 Winner'''
 Jeanine Mason

 Controversy 

On May 21, 2009, SYTYCD'' aired two males performing ballroom dance together for the first time, with dancers Misha and Mitchel performing a Samba. The dance couple's introduction on the show, and the judges' subsequent comments, have been criticized as homophobic. The two men were introduced with The Weather Girls' "It's Raining Men" played in the background. After the couple performed, judge Nigel Lythgoe said, "I think you'd probably alienate a lot of our audience. We've always had the guys dance together on the show but they've never really done it in each other's arms before. I'm really one of those people that like to see guys be guys and girls be girls on stage. I don't think I liked it, to be frank." He later went on to say that he'd like each man to dance with women and that: "You never know, you might enjoy that, too." The segment closed, and the song "It's a Man's Man's Man's World" is played in the background, which contains the lyrics: "This is a man's world, but it wouldn't be nothing, nothing without a woman or a girl." Cat Deeley went on to say that the pair were "out."

Lythgoe issued a formal apology letter later that week, stating that he regretted "poor word choices" and that he realized how his comments could be "misconstrued." He went on to say that he "believe[s] the sexual orientation of an auditioner or contestant is irrelevant... the fact that I have unintentionally upset people is distressing to me... I have made mistakes that I must learn from."

Tour 
So You Think You Can Dance went on tour through 40 cities across the US and 1 city in Canada, Toronto. Nigel had also announced that Phillip Chbeeb and Caitlin Kinney would also be going on the tour as swing dancers since they made it to the top 12 before being cut.

Ratings

U.S. Nielsen ratings

See also 
 List of So You Think You Can Dance finalists

References

External links 
 Official "So You Think You Can Dance" Website

2009 American television seasons
Season 05